The , branded "ALFA-X", is a ten-car experimental Shinkansen train operated by East Japan Railway Company (JR East) in Japan to test technology to be incorporated into future trains operating at speeds of up to . The name is an acronym for "Advanced Labs for Frontline Activity in rail eXperimentation".
The first train was unveiled on May 9, 2019. 
The Plarail (series of toy trains) "Ippai Tsunago" Shinkansen Test Train ALFA-X began to be sold on December 26, 2019. Its test run is mainly performed in sections between Sendai and Shin-Aomori of the Tohoku Shinkansen line, and, in some cases, on the Hokkaido Shinkansen line.

Design
These technologies include dampers to reduce vibration and the likelihood of derailment in major earthquakes. It also tests body designs that reduce snow adherence.

The E956 train evaluates two different end car nose profiles, just like the earlier Fastech 360. The E956 features eddy current brakes and an aerodynamic braking system attached to the car's roof, called air brakes or spoilers.

History

JR East officially announced its plans to build a ten-car ALFA-X test train on 4 July 2017, to be delivered in spring 2019 for extensive testing and evaluation. The finished train was unveiled on May 9, 2019.

The train was observed in Hokkaido for cold weather testing on February 12, 2020 and February 3, 2021.

References

External links

 JR East 2017 news release 
 JR East E956 data sheet 

Experimental and prototype high-speed trains
Shinkansen train series
Train-related introductions in 2019
Hitachi multiple units
Kawasaki multiple units
25 kV AC multiple units
Non-passenger multiple units